Oros may refer to:

 OROS, drug delivery system
 Oros, Sindhudurg, town in India
 Orós, municipality in Ceará, Brazil

People
 Oros of Alexandria, 5th century Byzantine lexicographer and grammarian
 Corneliu Oros (born 1950), Romanian former volleyball player
 Cristian Oroș (born 1984), Romanian football player
 Ernest L. Oros (died 2012), American politician from New Jersey
 George Oros (born 1954), American lawyer and politician from New York
 Joe Oros (1916–2012), American automotive designer
 Petro Oros (1917–1953) Ukrainian clandestine Greek-Catholic bishop
 Rozalia Oros (born 1964), Romanian fencer
 Yaroslav Oros (born 1959) Ukrainian writer and journalist

See also
 Oro (disambiguation)

Romanian-language surnames